Maile is a species of flowering plant in the dogbane family, Apocynaceae, that is endemic to Hawaii.

Maile may also refer to:

People named Maile

Given name
Maile Chapman, American novelist and short story writer.
Maile Flanagan (born 1965), American actress
Maile Meloy (born 1972), American fiction author
Maile Meyer (born 1957), Native Hawaiian activist and entrepreneur
Maile Misajon (born 1976), American singer and songwriter
Maile Mölder (born 1977), Estonian curler and curling coach
Maile O'Keefe (born 2002), American gymnast
Maile Shimabukuro (born 1970), member of the Hawaii House of Representatives

Surname
Heiko Maile (born 1966), German musician and composer
Luke Maile (born 1991), American baseball player
Pita Maile (born 1990), Tongan rugby league player
Thabiso Maile (born 1987), Mosotho footballer
Tim Maile, American television writer
Vic Maile (1943–1989), British record producer

Fictional characters
Maile Duval, in the 1961 movie Blue Hawaii

See also
Miley (disambiguation)